"Vidlunnia Mriy" is a song  by Ruslana featuring T-Pain, featured on her 2008 studio album Wild Energy. The arrangement and recording were conducted by Ego Works / The Hit Factory Criteria, Miami, United States. The Ukrainian version of the song was released as radio single.

Music video

The music video for "Moon of Dreams", directed by Malkom Jones, was shot simultaneously in Kyiv and Los Angeles. In 4 shooting days, 4 hours of footage are captured. At the same time, fantasy worlds are being created, covered with clouds of surreal colors, rocks and burning glaciers. Two moons transform into two suns. All 164 frames are created in 5 months. To portray fantasy elements, the designers used ten kilos of ice, two tracks of soil and stones, several tons of fuel for special effects and unrestrained extreme imagination and bravery.

Ruslana has said about the video:

Chart performance

Release history

References 

2008 singles
Ruslana songs
T-Pain songs
2008 songs